Robertsbridge is a village in the civil parish of Salehurst and Robertsbridge, and the Rother district of East Sussex, England. It is approximately 10 miles (16 km) north of Hastings and 13 miles (21 km) south-east of Royal Tunbridge Wells. The River Rother passes through the village.

History
The village is thought to date back to 1176 when a Cistercian abbey was founded there by the Abbot, Robert de St Martin. When a market charter was granted in 1198 by Richard I to Robertsbridge (Pons Roberti in Latin) it was the first recorded use of the name. The abbey was dissolved in 1538;  however, the town flourished, and many of the oldest existing houses in the village date from the 14th and 15th centuries, including The Seven Stars Inn in the High Street. From the village was discovered the Robertsbridge Codex (1360), a music manuscript from the 14th century. It contains the earliest surviving music written specifically for keyboard.

Transport 
Robertsbridge Railway Station is on the main railway line from Hastings to London, and the A21 trunk road. The Robertsbridge bypass opened in 1989.

Education 
Robertsbridge Community College, a specialist mathematics and computer college, is the smallest such in the county of East Sussex. Salehurst Church of England Primary School is also located in the village.

Community facilities 
Robertsbridge cultural organizations include Robertsbridge Arts Partnership (RAP], a Jazz Club and Robertsbridge Wine Club  (RWC). Sports clubs include Robertsbridge Cricket Club. and formerly Robertsbridge Rugby Football Club, which disbanded in the 2008-2009 season.  Robertsbridge has a bonfire society.

Economy 
Robertsbridge is the home to several notable sporting equipment brands. Parent company Grays International have been based in Robertsbridge since moving from Cambridgeshire in the 1990s. The company makes cricket equipment under the Gray-Nicolls brand, netball and rugby equipment as Gilbert, and hockey equipment as Grays.

Religion 
Robertsbridge United Reformed Church, a Grade II-listed chapel built in 1881, stands on the High Street. The former Bethel Strict Baptist Chapel, built in 1842 and also listed Grade II, is nearby.  A residential Bruderhof community, known as Darvell, is located on the outskirts of the village.

Notable people
People who have lived in Robertsbridge include educationalist and women's rights activist Barbara Bodichon, journalist Malcolm Muggeridge,, model Heather Mills, and footballer Sam Jennings who died there in 1944.

Demography

The demographics above are drawn from the National Statistics Office, 2001 Census. As data is not available for Robertsbridge in isolation, the table includes the entire parish of Salehurst and Robertsbridge.

As data for the table above is not available for Robertsbridge in isolation, it is drawn from the Salehurst Ward which covers a larger area including Salehurst, Robertsbridge and Bodiam.

References

External links

 Salehurst and Robertsbridge Parish Council
 Robertsbridge Community College

 
Villages in East Sussex
Market towns in East Sussex
Rother District